Patrick Aaron Angerer (born January 31, 1987) is a former American football linebacker in the National Football League (NFL). He was drafted by the Indianapolis Colts in the second round of the 2010 NFL Draft. He played college football at Iowa.

High school career
Angerer attended Bettendorf High School in Bettendorf, Iowa, where he recorded career totals of 344 tackles, including 63 tackles for loss, 17 quarterback sacks, five forced fumbles, four recovered fumbles and one interception while playing middle linebacker. A team captain as a senior, he holds school records for tackles in a game (25), season (197) and career (344). Angerer earned first team all-state honors as a senior and junior.

Considered a three-star recruit by Rivals.com, Angerer was listed as the No. 26 inside linebacker prospect in the nation. He chose the University of Iowa over Iowa State, Indiana and Northern Illinois.

College career
After redshirting his initial year at Iowa, Angerer saw limited action as third team weak side linebacker in his freshman season, and second team weak side linebacker in his injury-filled sophomore season.

Working through mononucleosis, as well as hamstring, groin and shoulder injuries, Angerer finally made the starting lineup in 2008. Occupying the middle linebacker spot, he led the Hawkeyes in tackles with 107 stops, including 45 solo tackles and 62 assists, and also had five interceptions. Angerer subsequently earned Second-team All-Big Ten honors in 2008.

For the 2009 season, Angerer was named to Butkus Award, Lombardi Award, and Bednarik Award watch lists. By November 2009, Angerer was named one of sixteen semifinalists for the Bednarik Award.

Professional career

Indianapolis Colts
In the 2010 NFL Draft Angerer was selected by the Indianapolis Colts with the sixty-third overall pick.

Angerer finished the 2010 preseason with 36 tackles and 2 sacks. He started the season backing up Gary Brackett at middle linebacker. Angerer made his first career start during Week 6 against the Washington Redskins in place of an injured Brackett. Angerer had an impressive game with 11 tackles, a sack and 2 passes defended.

In 2011, Angerer was the starting middle linebacker for all 16 regular season games and he led the Colts in tackles with 148.

Atlanta Falcons
On July 22, 2014, Angerer signed a one-year contract with the Atlanta Falcons. He was subsequently released by the Falcons for final roster cuts before the start of the 2014 season.

On October 14, 2014, Angerer announced his retirement.

NFL statistics

Personal life
Angerer is the son of Mary and Cliff Angerer. He has three older brothers and one older sister. In middle school he was a star baseball player for the Bettendorf Diamondkings. Angerer proposed to his high school sweetheart, Mary Beth Porter, after the Orange Bowl victory. They were married on July 10, 2010, in Bettendorf, IA.

Pat and Tavian Banks are currently the only former Bettendorf Bulldogs to be drafted into the NFL.

References

External links
Indianapolis Colts bio
Official Iowa Hawkeyes football bio

1987 births
Living people
People from Bettendorf, Iowa
Players of American football from Iowa
American football linebackers
Iowa Hawkeyes football players
Indianapolis Colts players
Atlanta Falcons players
Bettendorf High School alumni